(Miss)understood (stylized in all lowercase) is the seventh studio album by Japanese singer-songwriter Ayumi Hamasaki, released January 1, 2006 by Avex Trax. Hamasaki acted as the album's sole lyricist, as she had on all of her preceding albums. (Miss)understood marked new musical directions for Hamasaki: she explored new influences such as funk and used gospel choruses in some of the songs, foreign to her previous works. This was the result of her having heard compositions by Geo from Sweetbox and asking him for his works; subsequently, Hamasaki rewrote the lyrics to fit (Miss)understood. Lyrically, the album was a departure from her previous work, My Story, which had been primarily autobiographical.

Where My Story had contained "musings about her past", Hamasaki wanted the lyricism on (Miss)understood to send a strong message to all women—to be a kind of "girls' talk" to give "moral support", while at the same time reminding women that there were times when they would feel weak and low. These themes, along with the album's funk influences, are epitomized on songs such as "Bold & Delicious" and "Ladies Night".

"Step You/Is This Love?" was released as the lead single from (Miss)understood on April 20, 2005. It was a commercial success, reaching number one in Japan and receiving a Platinum certification, selling 345,340 copies in its chart run. It was the nineteenth best-selling song in Japan in 2005, and Hamasaki's best-selling single that year. Second single "Fairyland" was released August 3, and debuted at number one in Japan. It sold 170,000 copies in its first week, the most of any single from (Miss)understood. It went on to sell 316,663 copies, receiving a platinum certification. The third single, "Heaven", experienced similar success: it reached number one, and was certified Platinum, selling around 325,000 copies. "Bold & Delicious/Pride" was not as successful. Despite reaching number one, it became her poorest-selling single at the time since 1998's "Depend on You", selling only 133,000 copies.

(Miss)understood was commercially successful, opening at number one in Japan (her eighth consecutive record to do so) with first-week sales of 653,830 copies. It went on to sell over 877,000 copies in Japan in its 31-week chart run, receiving a Million certification and becoming the 8th best-selling album of 2006. It is, to date, her last Million-certified album. According to Avex, It is also her first album to fail to hit over a million sales in Japan according to Oricon. By 2007 (Miss)understood sold 1,030,000 copies in Japan.

Production

Background and themes
In 2005, after hearing demo tracks from band Sweetbox's then-upcoming album Addicted, Hamasaki "fell in love" with the songs and consequently asked Sweetbox's composer GEO if she could use some of the songs for her album. GEO agreed and gave Hamasaki permission to use "Bold & Delicious", "Pride", "Ladies Night", "In the Corner", "Every Step", and "Beautiful Girl". Hamasaki then set to work rewriting the lyrics and rearranging parts of songs.

While My Story, Hamasaki's preceding album, contained mostly "autobiographical" lyrics and "musings about [her] past", (Miss)understood was a "strong message to send to all women": it was a kind of "girl's talk" to give "moral support" while at the same time reminding women that there would be times when they would "feel weak and low". "Bold & Delicious" "scolded indecisive men", "Pride" expressed Hamasaki's appreciation of "women who do not give up easily", and "Ladies Night" was about female camaraderie. Other themes appeared as well: "Is This Love?" and "Heaven" were about love, and "Fairyland" was about "childhood memories".

Composition

(Miss)understood is more musically diverse than My Story; Hamasaki incorporated a variety of musical styles including rock, dance-pop and funk. The album opens with "Bold & Delicious", a funk-infused dance track that utilises a gospel choir in the harmony. The song makes use of funk guitars. "Pride" is a ballad song that "sounded like it could be from a musical"; the arrangement of both songs were influenced by Hamasaki's trip to New York City to record the songs and film their respective music videos. An organ Hamasaki heard while visiting a church inspired her to include the gospel choir in "Bold", while the musical The Phantom of the Opera influenced her arrangement of "Pride". "Criminal", "Step You", "Alterna", and the titular "(Miss)understood" are all rock songs with prominent electric guitars, while "Heaven" is an "ethereal" piano-driven ballad. As with "Bold & Delicious" and "Pride", other songs composed by GEO were rearranged; violins were added to the bridge of "Rainy Day", and a choir was added to the chorus of "Beautiful Day".

Extras
The initial pressings of the album included two photobooks—one for the CD version (entitled "Off My Day"), and another for the CD+DVD version (entitled "On My Way"). The DVD version included all PV's that were made for her 2005 releases (excluding "My Name's Women")—"Step You", "Is This Love?", "Fairyland", "Alterna", "Heaven", "Bold & Delicious" and "Pride", as well as an alternative PV for "Bold & Delicious" (called the "Side Story"). Two new PVs were also included—"Ladies Night" and "Rainy Day" made their debut on the disc. Behind-the-scenes clips for "Step You", "Is This Love?", "Fairyland", "Alterna", "Heaven" and "Pride" are featured as well. The song "Rainy Day" was used as the ending theme for the game "Onimusha: Dawn of Dreams".

Music videos
The PV for "Step You" was directed by Tetsuo Inoue and the video featured Ayumi wearing different styles of outfits (signifying different parts of her image and personality). A man walks up to a music box-like contraption and as he activates the levers (shown as I, II, III, and IV) different miniature versions of Ayumi appear. As he activates the last lever, the contraption begins to short-circuit, and the four Ayumis turn into one.

The PV for "Is This Love?" was directed by Masashi Muto, the music video features Ayumi singing emotionally in a hotel suite. As she passes by, objects begin to explode (i.e. a bowl of fruit, a fish tank, walls, etc.). The video ends as Ayumi looks at the hotel, in one piece with no sort chaos that happened earlier.

The PV of "Fairyland" was shot in Hawaii and is one of the most expensive music videos in the world, as well as being Japan's most expensive music video in terms of production costs. The PV cost 240 million Yen (2 million in U.S. dollars). The video was directed by Wataru Takeishi and it depicts Hamasaki with her companions (dance team) on a lush tropical island, with some scenes showing a timber house with a deck. Eventually, a fallen oil lamp causes the entire structure to burn. Images from earlier sequences showing the group having fun are interspersed through the burning of the house. The video ends with the camera moving away from Hamasaki singing solemnly as she watches the house burn.

The PV of "Alterna" depicts Ayumi as an up-coming star who is chased by clowns. The video also depicts her as a singing machine; this aspect of the music video (as well as the lyrics of "alterna") may be Hamasaki's response to either tabloid articles or to her record label's oppressive treatment of her at the time.

The PV for "Heaven" features Ayumi singing alone in a subway. As she does, ghosts frequently pass by her. Near the end of the video, the spirits leave Ayumi and board on a train (implying their departure to heaven). The video is done entirely in one shot and in black and white.

The music videos of "Bold & Delicious" and "Pride" were both filmed in New York and were both directed by Luis Hernandez.

In the video for "Bold & Delicious", Hamasaki is featured with long wavy black hair, and wears a faux fur jacket with a light pink dress. She is seen standing on the back of a moving truck driving through areas of New York City, evoking the iconic 1993 Björk music video for her single "Big Time Sensuality". Some shots feature "behind the scenes" material, showing footage of the truck driving around the city and film crew members.

The video for "Pride" features several long takes of Hamasaki in a black dress being prepared by assistants and make-up artists, and then walking through an on-location set prepared under a New York City bridge and in the rain.

The music video for "Ladies Night" features Ayumi wearing a pink and blue mini dress, and her legendary long blue leg muffs as she walks down a hotel hallway, trying to go into some of the rooms, and occasionally singing into a payphone. Scenes of different things happening in the rooms can be seen. In one room, a maid is mounted on a man and is whipping him. In another room, a woman dressed in a white 18th century dress and white powdered wig is seen walking around her room, which is all white and has a large collection of butterflies. In the third room, a strange woman in a bulky black dress with a long braided black wig and face painted all in black (later revealed to be Ayumi herself) is seen dominating and whipping mannequins. The hotel room scenes have been compared by many to the 1995 indie film Four Rooms. In between the hotel room scenes there are other scenes of Ayumi dressed in a dictator's outfit and addressing an army of bald and pale women in an outdoor arena that resembles the Colosseum. The women all appear to have the same face and march along to Ayumi's singing during the song's middle eight.

The music video of "Rainy Day" features Ayumi with short-black hair singing in a house looking in and out of the window. The scene then cuts to her sitting at a bus stop, wearing a white-powered wig. A dog appears out of an alleyway. The dog and Ayumi stare at each other. During the mid-eight, rain has started to fall and the dog is no longer in the scene. Images of people passing the bus stop with umbrellas are shown. An Hansom cab then arrives and picks up Ayumi. She sees the lone dog again and looks back with a regretful face. The house scenes featuring shows Ayumi collapsing onto the floor and crying.

Sales
In 2007, Avex reported that (Miss)understood sold 1,030,000 copies in Japan. (Miss)understood was certified million by RIAJ in sales and was recognized for having more than a million copies shipped to store. On the Oricon Charts, (Miss)understood failed to break a million-selling only a little under 900,000 in 2006, but by 2007 it was able to sell 1,030,000 copies. The total sales number of the album's singles comes to a total of 1,285,000. The album sales and the single sales combined come to a grand sales revenue of 2,315,000 CDs sold.

Track listing

Charts

 Total sales: 1,030,000 (Japan)
 Total sales: 1,140,000 (Avex)

Singles

Total single sales: 1,285,000
Total album and single sales: 2,315,000

Release history

Notes

References

 The liner notes for (Miss)understood (Japanese version). AVCD-17837/B

2006 albums
Ayumi Hamasaki albums
Avex Group albums
Albums produced by Max Matsuura
Japanese-language albums